Kenny Powers is a fictional world famous baseball player in the HBO television comedy series Eastbound & Down, played by Danny McBride. He is portrayed as a once dominant baseball pitcher, whose poor work ethic, ego, and short temper jeopardized his professional career. In season one, Powers becomes a substitute physical education teacher who is attempting to make a return to Major League Baseball.

Character biography
As a 19-year-old closing pitcher, Powers enjoys a spectacular Major League debut, leading Atlanta to the World Series. But Powers' abrasive personality leads him to trouble as he bounces from Atlanta to New York, then to San Francisco, Boston, and finally Seattle in subsequent years. Powers quickly wears out his welcome everywhere he goes, enraging fans with inflammatory statements as his fastball rapidly loses velocity. He tries to compensate for this weakness by using steroids to improve his performance, but in less than seven years he finds his Major League Baseball career over. Lost for direction, he goes back to his hometown of Shelby, North Carolina to accept a job as a substitute physical education teacher at his former school, Jefferson Davis Middle School. He simultaneously tries to win back the affections of former flame April Buchanon while also trying to earn another shot at the majors. He eventually flees to Mexico in shame when his planned Major League comeback fails to materialize.

After laying low in Mexico and playing in an independent league, Kenny finally gets an opportunity for redemption when he's signed by the Myrtle Beach Mermen, the minor league affiliate of the Texas baseball organization. Though still prone to unpredictable and abrasive behavior, Powers manages to keep it together long enough to achieve his dream and he gets called up to pitch in the majors again. However, Powers fakes his own death, believing it is the only way to win back April's heart.

Years after Kenny fakes his death (which he was arrested for) he lives in suburbia with his wife and two children as an employee of a car rental company. Upon meeting an old sports colleague, Kenny, who is fed up with his boring life, quits his job and gets his friend to offer him a guest spot on his show The Sports Sesh. After an embarrassing first appearance, Kenny trains to be better and verbally knocks the current wild card football star of the show until he quits, and Kenny received thunderous applause.

Merchandise

HBO introduced officially licensed Eastbound & Down T-shirts featuring quotes from the show as well as shirts based on Kenny Powers' Atlanta and Charros jersey.

Advertisement
In 2011, K-Swiss began an ad campaign featuring Kenny Powers as the new CEO of K-Swiss. The campaign focuses on the new Tubes line of K-Swiss shoes.

See also

References

External links
 Kenny Powers: Career statistics

Fictional baseball players
Fictional characters from North Carolina
Television characters introduced in 2009
Fictional illeists
Fictional schoolteachers
People from Shelby, North Carolina